The Tulsa Zoo is an  non-profit zoo located in Tulsa, Oklahoma, United States. The Tulsa Zoo is owned by the City of Tulsa, but since 2010, has been privately managed by Tulsa Zoo Management, Inc. The zoo is located in Mohawk Park, one of the largest municipal parks in the United States.

The zoo is involved in conservation efforts such as a push to reduce the use of palm oil, FrogWatch USA, and efforts to encourage ocean conservation.

The Tulsa Zoo is accredited by the Association of Zoos and Aquariums.

Distinctions
In 2005, the Tulsa Zoo was named as "America's Favorite Zoo" by Microsoft Game Studios and was granted $25,000 in a contest designed to promote the Zoo Tycoon 2 computer game. The contest counted votes from zoo visitors across the country for many of America's top zoos, including the San Diego Zoo and the Bronx Zoo.

Animals and exhibits

Lost Kingdom Exhibit Complex
Lost Kingdom allows guests to roam through lush gardens and settings inspired by ancient Asian cultures, such as the city at Angkor-Wat. Lost Kingdom is the new home for ambassadors of some of Asia's rarest and most elusive species, including Malayan tigers, snow leopards, Chinese alligators, siamangs, binturongs, and Komodo dragons.

Lost Kingdom: Valley of the Elephant

The Valley of the Elephant encompasses a  area for the zoo's three elephants. The area includes a life-sized climbable elephant sculpture and an Elephant Interpretive Center which highlights the life of Asian elephant species. Visitors can observe the elephants from both indoor and outdoor viewing areas in an exhibit that includes an elephant demonstration yard.

Robert J. LaFortune Wild Life Trek
The Robert J. LaFortune Wild Life Trek is a four-building complex, formerly the North American Living Museum, and is the recipient of awards such as best new exhibit when it was constructed in 1978. As of spring 2013, each building focuses on animals from around the world and their adaptations to life in the water, desert, forest, and cold. Animals in this complex include Siberian cranes, tawny frogmouth, emerald doves, chinchilla, peccary, seahorses, and grizzly bears.

The Rainforest
A naturalistic re-creation of a Central and South American rainforest environment. Spanning 13,000 square feet of indoor exhibit space, exhibits include exotic species such as black howler monkeys, a green anaconda, piranhas, dwarf caimans, jaguars, and golden-headed lion tamarins. Many species are not caged, including rainforest birds, two-toed sloths, and Jamaican fruit bats to allow for a more realistic jungle feel. Throughout this exhibit is evidence of native cultures, from the colossal Olmec Head which marks the entrance to the exhibit, to murals and structures incorporated within exhibits. The roof is composed of translucent panels to illuminate the canopy of the rainforest, and a path that guides visitors through the building.

Chimpanzee Connection

This large outdoor island habitat provides chimpanzees with access to a climbing structure consisting of cargo nets and ropes, caves, a termite mound and vegetation. The cage-less habitat allows guests a clearer view of the chimpanzees. Completed in 1991, the "Chimpanzee Connection" building provides indoor viewing through glass. offering a glimpse into the private lives of the chimpanzees. After its completion Dr. Jane Goodall proclaimed the facility to be one of the "best she has ever seen".

Helmerich Sea Lion Cove
A naturalistic habitat for California sea lions opened in 2012. The exhibit features a saltwater pool, large underwater viewing window wall, waterfall, rock haul-out areas, themed holding building and a large covered seating area for visitors. A behavioral conditioning program intended to provide visitors with information about the resident sea lions is demonstrated.

Penguin Habitat

The exhibit opened to the public in 2002. The penguin enclosure is the foundation of "Oceans and Islands", an exhibit area for the zoo that includes a naturalistic African penguin exhibit and a flamingo colony and also black and white ruffed lemurs. The design for the penguin habitat includes geo-thermal heating and cooling to regulate the water temperature for the warm water inhabitants. A "wave pool" or water action simulator, plus a rocky coastline setting, imitates their natural habitat. Special viewing windows were built into the wall of the exhibit for visitors to observe the penguins underwater. The exhibit currently holds 20 penguins and can hold up to 30.

African Plains
The African Plains area of the zoo features a variety of animals including meerkats, giraffes, lions, aldabra tortoises, white rhinos, and African wild dogs. The zoos recently opened the Mary K. Chapman Rhinoceros Reserve, which replaced an older facility and hosts the zoo's two white rhinoceroses.

Children's Zoo
The Children's Zoo has a contact yard where children can get up close with Nigerian dwarf goats, Southdown sheep, Katahdin sheep, earless American Lamancha goats, and Anglo-Nubian goats. There are also dexter cows, miniature horses, and Guinea forest hogs. This exhibit also contains the Australian Outback Area, which has red kangaroos. The Children's Zoo also includes North American river otters.

Dave Zucconi Conservation Center
Constructed in 1957, the Conservation Center has a large variety of animals including primates, reptiles, birds, and fish. Some animals exhibited include American flamingos, wrinkled hornbills, giant snakehead, radiated tortoises, Diana monkeys, white-faced saki monkeys, Fiji banded iguanas, and a Grand Cayman Island blue iguana.

Tulsa Penguins On Parade
The African black-footed penguin exhibit was funded through a citywide art campaign, popularized by the gifting of 6-foot (1.8 m) sculptures, depicting a penguin with certain visual characteristics based on its location or owner, to businesses or organizations who donated to the exhibit. There are currently 29 of these sculptures throughout the city; they are popularly known as "Tulsa Penguins".

Future developments
As part of the zoo's new 20-year Master Plan, released in 2012, the zoo announced that work would begin on the second master plan project. The second project is The Lost Kingdom Exhibit highlighting rare animals from Asia. Animals exhibiting include Malayan tigers, snow leopard and Komodo dragon. The Helmerich Foundation made the lead gift to fund the zoo's new tiger exhibit. In honor of the gift, the Tulsa Zoo named the new facility Lost Kingdom: The Helmerich Tiger exhibit, part of the Lost Kingdom complex. In addition to The Helmerich Foundation's gift, the Hardesty Family Foundation also donated to the Lost Kingdom complex. The Hardesty Family Foundation made a contribution for the new snow leopard facility, Lost Kingdom: The Hardesty Snow Leopard habitat. This new exhibit provides the zoo's snow leopards a state-of-the-art enclosure, while allowing guests to see the animals up close.

Conservation program

The Tulsa Zoo Conservation Program is one of the leading conservation organizations in Oklahoma. It has supported over 200 projects globally and locally, including a conservation education program to reduce the use of palm oil, FrogWatch USA, and ocean conservation education.

Controversy
The Tulsa Zoo attracted national media attention in 2005 when a group complained about the mention of evolutionary theory and the inclusion of religious icons, theories, and beliefs in zoo displays, including a statue of the Hindu elephant-headed god Ganesha as part of the elephant exhibition. The Tulsa Park Board responded by voting to add a display on Creationism. The board subsequently reconsidered and reversed its decision, citing widespread public criticism.

History timeline

1927- Tulsa Zoological Society was incorporated

1931 - Monkey Island, with a population of 40 monkeys purchased at $7 each, was dedicated by Mayor George Watkins

1939 - The current koi pond was completed by the W.P.A. as an alligator exhibit.

1950 - "Duke", the first chimpanzee at the Tulsa Zoo arrived.

1954 - The zoo's first elephant "Gunda", a four-year-old female Asian elephant was donated by Tulsa Jaycees.

1957 - The Primate Aviary Building (currently called the Conservation Center), a $458,000 project was completed. Work also began on the $27,000 elephant building and yard.

1962 - A pair of reticulated giraffes, purchased by the children of Tulsa through the Tulsa World, arrived from the Oklahoma City Zoo. These were the first giraffes in the Tulsa Zoo.

1964 - The construction of the Cat and Bear Grottos along with the sea lion pool, and flamingo pool was completed. Welcoming the zoo's first polar bear.

1965 - The baby giraffe "Shakey" was born, and bottle-raised by the staff. The Tulsa Zoo became one of the few zoos in the nation to hand-raise several giraffes.

1966 - Hugh S. Davis, long-time zoo director of Tulsa, resigned.

1969 - David G. Zucconi assumed the duty of zoo director. Also, weekly appearances of zoo staff became a regular activity on the Uncle Zeb Show.

1970 - Computerized animal inventory system was established, making the Tulsa Zoo the second zoo in the nation to initiate such a program.

1971 - Tulsa Zoo Development, Inc. (TZDI) was chartered.

1972 - "Wildlife on Wheels" became the zoo's educational activity. And a zoo admission fee was instituted.

1974 - A pair of white rhinoceros arrive at the zoo.

1975 - Air conditioning was installed in the Primate Aviary Building. And two female polar bear cubs were born. The first of their species at the zoo.

1976 - The previously called Mohawk Park Zoo was now officially named Tulsa Zoological Park. The Administrative/Technical Services Building and exhibit workshop was completed. And the Tulsa Zoo was one of the first eleven zoos to be accredited by the AAZPA (presently named the Association of Zoos and Aquariums).

1977 - With the Children's Zooseum officially opening and the African Savanna under construction. The Tulsa Zoo also welcomed their first full-time staff Veterinarian position, and Sneezy a four-and-a-half-year-old Male Asian elephant.

1978 - The Robert J. Lafortune North American living Museum officially opened. The complex was neither a zoo nor a museum nor a botanical garden; rather, it was a unique natural history facility that includes all the things common to those institutions, with the goal of telling an integrated story about our continent's land and life.

1982 - The American Association of Museums awards their accreditation to the Tulsa Zoo. It becomes the 500th institution recognized. And a new snow leopard exhibit is built.

1984 - Oklahoma's first man-made cave was completed in the Eastern Forest Museum Building. The Tulsa Zoo's exhibit department constructed the entire cave and received the AAZPA's prestigious Significant Achievement Award.

1986 - The Tulsa Zoo celebrated the birth of a healthy male Asian elephant "Maverick". Maverick was the first elephant born in Oklahoma and also the only Asian elephant born in the U.S. that year. The zoo also moved their two giraffes from the previous exhibit to a new one funded by TZDI.

1988 - Dr. Jane Goodall visited the Tulsa Zoo and declared the zoo's chimpanzee exhibit one of the "top three exhibits in the U.S." and welcomed the Tulsa Zoo into her prestigious chimpanzoo program, an honor claimed by only 15 zoos in the country. Dinosaurs Alive! also took place this year being the first dinosaur exhibit hosted by the zoo.

1990 - Mary Collins was hired as Tulsa Zoo Friends (formerly TZDI) new executive director. Also With almost 700 party-goers Waltz On The Wild Side kicked off its first year of fundraising

Zoo director Dave Zucconi becomes president of the American Zoo and Aquarium Association.

1991 - Tulsa Zoo Development Inc. officially changed its name to Tulsa Zoo Friends, Inc. And the indoor Chimpanzee Connection opened to the public.

1992 - Construction began on the new main entry, gift shop, elephant compound, commissary, exhibits building, animal reserve, and finally the new restaurant.

1993 - The Aldabra tortoise facility was completed. The Spotted Zebra Gift Shop, Safari Grille, and New entry officially opened. And Dinosaurs Alive! returned and welcomed 128,000 visitors in the three-month period.

Maverick the Asian elephant soon became a Tulsa favorite when he was orphaned shortly after birth. At the young age of seven he unfortunately contracted a fast-moving bacterial infection and died.

1994 - The Shark Aquarium was completed and the first bronze statue "The Frog" was installed.

1995 - The BOK Pavilion and the Boatmen's/BANK IV Amphitheater were completed. Also, the award-winning Elephant Encounter Museum which was funded by TZF and designed entirely by the exhibits staff was completed.

1996 - The Ethel F. Crate granite globe fountain was installed. The polar bear exhibit received a major renovation and the Helmerich Playground was opened.

1997 - The Helmerich Discovery Center was completed. The cheetah, meerkat and dik-diks exhibits were finished. And the long-awaited Tropical American Rainforest also opened.

1998 - The Children's Zoo contact yard opened, and the bull elephant viewing was installed. The Tulsa Zoo also held the AZA National Conference in September.

1999 - Siamang/langur habitat and overlook completed. Also, the black & white ruffed lemur exhibit was renovated.

2000 - Siamang Interactive Area for children was completed. And the "Wings of Wonder" butterfly exhibit opened.

2002 - The African Penguin exhibit officially opened. It was dedicated in honor of Mary Collins; this won the ABC Excellence in Construction Award.

2003 - Conservation Center (formerly Animal Kingdom) was officially renamed.

2004 - A new Veterinary Hospital was complete. And The Maasai exhibit in the African section of the zoo was also finished.

2005 - A temporary koala exhibit was added to the Conservation Center. And the Tulsa Zoo was awarded "America's Favorite Zoo" in the national competition by Microsoft.

2006 - The Oklahoma Trails exhibit was added in honor of Oklahoma's 100th birthday. And the North American Living Museum exhibited bison in honor of the Centennial.

2007 - A new Elephant Demonstration Yard was opened and dedicated to Larry Nunley for his 32 years of service to the zoo.

2008 - "Feather Fest" was added as a temporary free flight bird exhibit.

2009 - The HA Chapman Event Lodge opened.

2012 - Sea Lion Cove a new naturalistic sea lion exhibit was complete.

2013 - After years of renovations the former Robert J. Lafortune North American Living Museum reopened as the Robert J. Lafortune WildLIFE Trek. It no longer focused on only animals from North America but now animals from across the world with adaptations to living in the cold, desert, forest, and water.

2014 - The former Elephant Encounter Museum received a renovation and renaming to the Lost Kingdom: Valley of the Elephant Interpretive Center. Also, Zoorassic Park, a temporary dinosaur exhibit, displayed 15 animatronic dinosaurs. As the very first exhibit of the new 20-year master plan, the Mary K. Chapman Rhino Reserve opened.

2015 - A temporary dinosaur exhibit returned for its second year as Zoorassic Park 2. The zoo's largest fundraiser Waltz on the Wild Side celebrated 25 years of fundraising. And the zoo was featured nationwide as the top Instagram location in Oklahoma.

References

External links

1927 establishments in Oklahoma
Zoos in Oklahoma
Buildings and structures in Tulsa, Oklahoma
Economy of Tulsa, Oklahoma
Natural history museums in Oklahoma
Museums in Tulsa, Oklahoma
Tourist attractions in Tulsa, Oklahoma
Zoos established in 1927